Nuup Kangerlua is a  long fjord in the Sermersooq municipality in southwestern Greenland. It was formerly known by its colonial name as Godthaab Fjord, Gilbert Sound and Baal's River.

Located by the island's capital, Nuuk, it is the longest fjord on the Labrador Sea coast of Greenland, and one of the longest in the inhabited part of the country.

Geography 

Settlement 
Nuuk, the capital of Greenland, is located near the mouth of the fjord, on a mountainous peninsula bounding the fjord from the southeast.

See also
List of fjords of Greenland

References 

Fjords of Greenland
Labrador Sea
Geography of Nuuk